Several municipalities in the Canadian province of Quebec held mayoral and council elections on November 9, 1986. The most closely watched contest was in Montreal, where Jean Doré was elected to his first term as mayor.

Results

Montreal

Montréal-Nord

Cowansville
Jacques Charbonneau was elected to his first term as mayor. Future mayor Arthur Fauteux was elected to his first term on council.

Longueuil

Jean L'Écuyer, defeated in the 1986 election, was elected as a school trustee on the Commission scolaire Jacques-Cartier in 1987. In the 2007 provincial election, a candidate named Jean L'Écuyer ran for the Action démocratique du Québec party in Brome—Missisquoi. It is not known if this was the same person.

References

 
1986